The strada statale 18 "Tirrena Inferiore" (SS 18) is an Italian state road, connecting Campania and Calabria. It is among the longest and most important state highways in southern Italy, considering that it follows the Tyrrhenian coast, from Salerno to Reggio di Calabria.

History
The road was created in 1928 with the following route: "Naples - Torre Annunziata - Salerno - Battipaglia - Rutino - Vallo - Torre Orsaia - Sapri - Paola - Sant'Eufemia Lamezia - Nicastro - Monteleone - Reggio Calabria." The road was called "Tirrena Inferiore", from the name of the Tyrrhenian Sea. In 1953 the route was modified.

Route

Old route from Naples (now SR ex SS18)
Campania

Metropolitan City of Naples:
Naples, San Giorgio a Cremano, Portici, Ercolano, Torre del Greco, Torre Annunziata, Pompei.

Province of Salerno:
Scafati, Angri, Sant'Egidio del Monte Albino, Pagani, Nocera Inferiore, Nocera Superiore, Cava de' Tirreni, Vietri sul Mare, Salerno.

Current route
Campania 

Province of Salerno: 
Salerno, Pontecagnano, Bivio Pratole (Montecorvino Pugliano-Bellizzi), Bellizzi, Battipaglia, Corno d'Oro (Eboli), Cioffi (Eboli), Santa Cecilia (Eboli), Ponte Barizzo (Capaccio), Paestum (Capaccio), Mattine (Agropoli), Ogliastro Cilento, Prignano Cilento, Sant'Antuono (Torchiara), Rutino, Omignano Scalo (Omignano), Vallo Scalo (Casal Velino), Pantana (Castelnuovo Cilento), Vallo della Lucania, Novi Velia, San Biase (Ceraso), Massascusa (Ceraso), Cuccaro Vetere, Futani, Montano Antilia, Laurito, Alfano, Castel Ruggero (Torre Orsaia), Torre Orsaia, Policastro Bussentino (Santa Marina), Capitello (Ispani), Villammare (Vibonati), Sapri.

Basilicata
Province of Potenza:

Acquafredda, Cersuta, Marina di Maratea , Castrocucco (all frazioni of Maratea).

Calabria
Province of Cosenza:

Tortora Marina (Tortora), Praia a Mare, San Nicola Arcella, Scalea, Santa Maria del Cedro, Grisolia, Cirella, Diamante, Belvedere Marittimo, Sangineto, Bonifati, Cetraro, Acquappesa, Marina di Guardia Piemontese (Guardia Piemontese), Marina di Fuscaldo (Fuscaldo), Paola, San Lucido, Falconara Albanese, Fiumefreddo Bruzio, Longobardi, Belmonte Calabro, Amantea, Campora San Giovanni.

Province of Catanzaro:

Nocera Terinese, Falerna Marina (Falerna), Gizzeria Lido (Gizzeria), Lamezia Terme, Curinga.

Province of Vibo Valentia:

Pizzo Calabro, Vibo Valentia, Mileto.

Metropolitan City of Reggio Calabria:

Rosarno, Gioia Tauro, Palmi, Seminara, Bagnara Calabra, Scilla, Villa San Giovanni, Reggio Calabria.

References

External links

018
Transport in Campania
Transport in Basilicata
Transport in Calabria
1928 establishments in Italy